Villers-lès-Cagnicourt (literally Villers near Cagnicourt) is a commune in the Pas-de-Calais department in the Hauts-de-France region of France.

Geography

History
The village church has plaques dedicated to several Canadian soldiers decorated for valour in the fighting nearby in 1918, including Sergeant Arthur George Knight, VC, of the 10th Battalion, CEF.

Population

Places of interest
 The church of St.Martin, rebuilt, along with much of the village, after World War I.

See also
Communes of the Pas-de-Calais department

References

Villerslescagnicourt